The Peacock egg is a jewel and rock crystal Easter egg made by Dorofeiev under the supervision of the Russian jeweller Peter Carl Fabergé in 1908. It was made for Nicholas II of Russia, who presented the Fabergé egg to his mother, the Dowager Empress Maria Feodorovna, in 1908.

The transparent egg is composed of rock crystal and gilt silver wire, and is quite simple in style.  The genius of the egg lay in its surprise.  The egg is held together by a clasp at the top, and when opened, falls into two halves, each with a rococo style mount.

Surprise
The peacock can be lifted from within the tree and wound up. Placed on a flat surface, it struts around, moving its head and spreads and closes his enamel tail.

Dorofeiev, the Fabergé workmaster, reportedly worked on the peacock and its prototypes for three years.

History

The Peacock egg was inspired by the 18th-century Peacock Clock made by James Cox. The clock was a present from Grigory Potemkin to Catherine the Great. The Peacock Clock was housed in the Winter Palace in Saint Petersburg, Russia, which is now the Hermitage Museum.

In 1927, the Peacock egg was sold with nine other Imperial eggs by the Antikvariat to Emanuel Snowman of Wartski in London. Bought by a Mr. Hirst in 1935, it was sold to Dr. Maurice Sandoz of Switzerland in 1949 and donated in 1955 to his Fondation Edouard et Maurice Sandoz (FEMS) in Lausanne, Switzerland. Since its purchase by Sandoz, it has only been seen publicly six times, the last time in 2009.

See also
Egg decorating

References

Sources

External links

Article on the prototype for this egg from Fabergé Research Site

Imperial Fabergé eggs
1908 works